Achlada (before 1926: Κρουσοράτη - Krousorati; , Krushoradi, Macedonian: , Krušoradi) is a village in the Florina regional unit, Western Macedonia, Greece.

History
The settlement was  mentioned in an Ottoman tax register (defter) of 1626–1627, under the name of Krushorad, and was described as having sixty-one non-Muslim households. The Russian slavist Victor Grigorovich recorded Krushorade as mainly Bulgarian village in 1845. The population of the village was under the supremacy of the Bulgarian Exarchate in the beginning of the 20th century. The survey "La Macédoine et sa Population Chrétienne" by Dimitar Mishev concluded that the Christian population in 1905 was composed of 760 Bulgarian Exarchists. The name was changed to the Greek Achlada after the Balkan Wars. The father of Nikola Gruevski (former Prime Minister of North Macedonia) was born in Achlada.

Achlada had 313 inhabitants in 1981. In fieldwork done by Riki Van Boeschoten in late 1993, Achlada was populated by Slavophones. The Macedonian language was spoken by people over 60, mainly in private.

References

Populated places in Florina (regional unit)